The following lists events that happened during 1973 in Laos.

Incumbents
Monarch: Savang Vatthana 
Prime Minister: Souvanna Phouma

Events

February
21 February - The Vientiane Treaty is signed.

References

 
1970s in Laos
Years of the 20th century in Laos
Laos
Laos